Crystal Hayes (born September 25, 1984) is an American model, beauty pageant titleholder and actress. She was crowned Miss Michigan USA 2005 and competed at Miss USA pageant in Baltimore, Maryland, placing as a semi-finalist in 2005.

Career 
After the pageant, Crystal worked as an actress, model, host, and spokesperson for over ten years. She has modeled for brands such as CoverGirl, Maserati, Whirlpool, Lexus, Ford, and Wilhelmina. Crystal is best known for her role as Alethia, Hugh Laurie’s wife on Veep on HBO. Crystal's film career began when she was cast as a featured extra by director Michael Bay in 2010, featured extra in Real Steel with Hugh Jackman in 2010.

Filmography

References

Further reading

Busy beauty queen has many irons in the fire, Detroit Free Press, 9 December 2004 (accessed 7 May 2006)
Novi woman vies to be Miss USA, The Daily Oakland Press, 30 March 2005 (accessed 7 May 2006)
Local woman gears up for Miss USA pageant, The Daily Oakland Press, 15 March 2005 (accessed 7 May 2006)

External links
Crystal Hayes Website
Triniti Entertainment Website
Official Miss Michigan USA Website

1984 births
Living people
Miss USA 2005 delegates
People from Northville, Michigan
People from Oakland County, Michigan
American people of Finnish descent